Reinhoudt is a surname. Notable people with the surname include:

Don Reinhoudt (born 1945), American powerlifter and strongman
Engel Reinhoudt (1946–2020), Dutch troubadour and dialect writer